This is a list of international presidential trips made by Ronald Reagan, the 40th president of the United States. Ronald Reagan made 25 international trips to 26 different countries on four continents (Europe, Asia, North America, and South America) during his presidency, which began on January 20, 1981 and ended on January 20, 1989.

Summary
The number of visits per country where President Reagan travelled are:
 One visit to Barbados, Brazil, China, Colombia,  Costa Rica, Finland, Grenada, Honduras, Iceland, Indonesia, Ireland, Jamaica, Portugal, South Korea, Soviet Union, Spain, Switzerland
 Two visits to Belgium, Italy, Japan, Vatican City
 Three visits to United Kingdom
 Four visits to France
 Five visits to Canada
 Six visits to  Mexico,  West Germany

1981

1982

1983

1984

1985

1986

1987

1988

Multilateral meetings
Multilateral meetings of the following intergovernmental organizations took place during President Reagan's term in office (1981–1989).

See also
 Foreign policy of the Ronald Reagan administration
 Foreign policy of the United States

References

External links
 Travels of President Ronald Reagan. U.S. Department of State Office of the Historian.

Presidency of Ronald Reagan
20th century in international relations
1980s politics-related lists
Reagan, Ronald, international
Ronald Reagan-related lists